John Hindle (10 November 1921 – 21 January 1987) was an English professional footballer who made 282 appearances in the Football League playing as a goalkeeper for Preston North End, Barrow (two spells) and Aston Villa.

Hindle was born in Preston, Lancashire, in 1921 and died in Barrow-in-Furness, Cumbria, in 1987 at the age of 65.

References

1921 births
1987 deaths
Footballers from Preston, Lancashire
English footballers
Association football goalkeepers
Preston North End F.C. players
Barrow A.F.C. players
Aston Villa F.C. players
English Football League players